Éverson Alan da Lima (born July 1, 1986), also known as Lima, is a former Brazilian professional footballer.

Career 
The defender played previously with Clube Atlético Juventus, Tarxien Rainbows F.C., Atlético Monte Azul, SK Dynamo České Budějovice, Red Bull Brasil, Associação Desportiva Recreativa e Cultural Icasa and Volta Redonda Futebol Clube.

Lima played also professionally in the Campeonato Brasileiro Série A for Clube Atlético Juventus and in the Czech Gambrinus liga for Dynamo České Budějovice.

References

External links
 

1986 births
Living people
Brazilian footballers
Association football forwards
Expatriate footballers in Malta
Expatriate footballers in Hong Kong
Tarxien Rainbows F.C. players
Liga I players
Expatriate footballers in Romania
SK Dynamo České Budějovice players
Expatriate footballers in the Czech Republic
Hong Kong Premier League players
Tai Po FC players
Chattanooga FC players
People from Sorocaba
Footballers from São Paulo (state)